The Federation of National Specialty Societies of Canada is an organization of national specialty societies in Canada created in 2004 and it is based in Ottawa, Ontario, Canada.

It provides a forum for national specialty societies to discuss issues related to accessible medical specialty care in Canada. Morris Freedman, past president of the Canadian Neurological Society, is the current vice-president.

See also 
 Specialty Registrar
 American Board of Medical Specialties

References

External links
The Federation of National Specialty Societies of Canada  Canada

Medical and health organizations based in Ontario